Stenaelurillus termitophagus is a species of spider in the jumping spider family Salticidae, found in Southern Africa (Namibia, Botswana, South Africa).

References

Salticidae
Spiders of Africa
Spiders described in 1999